SDO Bussum is a football club from Bussum, Netherlands. SDO Bussum plays in the 2017–18 Sunday Hoofdklasse A.

Famous former players 

 Youri Mulder
Melvin Platje
Silvester van der Water

References

External links
 Official site

Football clubs in the Netherlands
Football clubs in North Holland
Sports clubs in Gooise Meren
Association football clubs established in 1917
1917 establishments in the Netherlands